Mustafa Ramid or Mustapha Ramid (born 1959 in Sidi Bennour, Morocco) is a Moroccan politician, lawyer from the Justice and Development Party. On 3 January 2012, he became Minister of Justice and Liberties in  Abdelilah Benkirane's government.

Having served as the defense lawyer for Islamist Hassan al-Kattani, Ramid played an important role in achieving the pardon of Kattani and other Islamists along with promises for the renunciation of violence and extremism.

Homophobia 
On July 7, 2015, during an interview on Chada FM radio, he advised homosexuals to change their sex to avoid problems. In September 2017, when questioned by a journalist on the rejection of the UN recommendations relating to the decriminalization of homosexuality by Morocco, he replied: "Enough is enough. Everyone gives importance to this homosexuality and wants to talk about it. These people are rubbish", and attracting the wrath of several Moroccan associations. He persisted a few days later, qualifying homosexuality as "sexual deviance" and affirming that it "remains a crime punished by Moroccan law and is moreover not acceptable by our society".

References

External links
Ministry of Justice and Liberties

Living people
Government ministers of Morocco
People from Sidi Bennour
20th-century Moroccan lawyers
Moroccan activists
1959 births
University of Hassan II Casablanca alumni
Justice and Development Party (Morocco) politicians
21st-century Moroccan lawyers